Brushy Voting House No. 6 was a voting house located at the junction of KY 32 and Spruce St. near Morehead, Kentucky.  It was built in 1935 out of ashlar cut stone, quarried nearby, and beaded mortar.

The voting house seems no longer to exist.

See also 
 Haldeman Voting House No. 8
 National Register of Historic Places listings in Rowan County, Kentucky

Notes

References

Voting houses
National Register of Historic Places in Rowan County, Kentucky
Government buildings completed in 1935
Former buildings and structures in Kentucky
1935 establishments in Kentucky
Demolished but still listed on the National Register of Historic Places
Government buildings on the National Register of Historic Places in Kentucky
Kentucky elections